Marie Cornu may refer to:

 Marie Alfred Cornu (1841–1902), French physicist
 Marie Maxime Cornu (1843–1901), French botanist and mycologist